Charalambos Panagidis (born 9 September 1968) is a Cypriot swimmer. He competed in the men's 100 metre breaststroke event at the 1992 Summer Olympics.

References

External links
 

1968 births
Living people
Cypriot male swimmers
Olympic swimmers of Cyprus
Swimmers at the 1992 Summer Olympics
Place of birth missing (living people)
Male breaststroke swimmers